Mahjoubi is a surname. Notable people with the surname include:
 Mohamed Ali Mahjoubi (born 1966), retired Tunisian football player
 Mounir Mahjoubi (born 1984), French politician, minister for digital affairs

See also 
 Mahjoub